Hazlewood Castle is a country residence, now a hotel, in North Yorkshire, England, by the A1 and A64 between Aberford and Tadcaster. It is one of the oldest fortified houses to survive in the whole of Yorkshire.

The site overlooked the battlefield for the Battle of Towton in 1461, and during the persecution of Catholics through the reign of Henry VIII provided refuge for Catholic priests.

History
The castle was built towards the end of the 13th century and was transformed into a mansion in the mid 18th century.

The first records of the house are to be found in the Domesday Book, described as being owned and occupied by Sir Mauger the Vavasour (a vavasour was a type of feudal liegeman). Hazlewood was then inhabited by descendants of the Vavasours for over 900 years. During the Second Barons' War (1264–1267) the chapel was burnt down by a rival branch of the Vavasour family. It was rebuilt in 1283 by Sir William Vavasour and in 1290 fortified and crenellated.

In 1217 Robert Vavasour was Sheriff of York and his statue was placed above the door of York Minster in recognition of the fact that he gave stone from his Tadcaster quarry to maintain the cathedral.

Sir William Vavasour was High Sheriff of Yorkshire for 1548 and 1563 and MP for Yorkshire in 1553. His son John Vavasour was host to Mary, Queen of Scots on the night of 27 January 1569, when she passed through Wetherby en-route between Bolton Castle and Tutbury Castle.

John was convicted in 1610 of being a Catholic recusant. His nephew and heir William was gaoled for five years in Newgate prison in London for the same reason. William's son Thomas was forced to pay an annual fine even though he had been made a baronet in 1628. The second Baronet was a Royalist during the Civil War and was obliged to flee to France, not returning until the restoration of the monarchy in 1660.

Under the 6th Baronet the house was substantially modernised. On the death of the unmarried 7th Baronet in 1826 the baronetcy was extinguished and the estate passed to Edward Stourton, a relative. In 1828 he took the name Vavasour and was made the 1st Baronet Vavasour of the second creation. In 1908 the Vavasour family sold Hazlewood and bought a sheep farm and land in the Awatere Valley, New Zealand and in the 1970s established the valley's first winery, Vavasour Winery. After 1908 the site changed hands many times over the following years. It was first owned by a solicitor named Simpson, whose family occupied it until 1953, although it also served as a maternity hospital during the Second World War (and afterwards until 1953). For a few years it then belonged to the Fawcett family until it was sold in 1958 to Donald Hart, who sold it on as a retreat for the Carmelite Friars from 1971 until 1996. At the time of the sale to the Carmelite Order, the building was listed and is now a grade I listed building.

Present-day

In 1997, after restoration, the house reopened as Hazlewood Castle Hotel-Restaurant-Café and Cookery School under the management of Richard Carr, John Benson-Smith and Alison Benson-Smith.

The Castle won Hotel of the year, Restaurant of the year and also Chef of the year and the Chef Director John Benson-Smith also appeared on BBC Master Chef as a judge.

Hazlewood was purchased by the Ashdale Hotels group in 2008, it has since continued to be a successful wedding venue and hotel.

References

External links

Hazlewood Castle website

Hotels in North Yorkshire
Country houses in North Yorkshire
Grade I listed buildings in North Yorkshire
Country house hotels